Promoxolane (Dimethylane) is a centrally acting muscle relaxant and anxiolytic drug.

References

Muscle relaxants
Primary alcohols
Dioxolanes
Drugs with unknown mechanisms of action
Isopropyl compounds